St. Laurent Centre (French: Centre St-Laurent) is a shopping mall located in Ottawa, Ontario, Canada. It is owned and operated by Morguard REIT. The shopping mall is located just north of Highway 417 at the corner of St. Laurent Boulevard and Coventry Road.

The mall opened in October 1967 housing 50 retailers with Simpson-Sears (later Sears), Freimans and Dominion as original anchors. Sears was the last original anchor to leave the mall, closing on January 8, 2018 due to bankruptcy of the chain. Hudsons Bay is currently the mall's oldest anchor tenant, having purchased Freimans in December 1971 and rebranding the store to The Bay in June 1973. On March 13, 1991, The Bay moved to its current two level location as part of a mall expansion. It is adjacent to the former space of The Bay and 50% larger. The former store was converted to a food court, office space, and other retailers. The mall is also anchored by Toys "R" Us.

On the afternoon of September 16, 2022, there was a physical altercation involving multiple people in their late teens and early 20s. The event took place just outside the mall's Dollarama. Marcus Maloney (19) was stabbed, and later pronounced dead in hospital. Mohammed Osman (18) was later charged with second degree murder, along with two counts of aggravated assault and one count of breaching release conditions after being apprehended by Ottawa Police overnight.

St. Laurent Centre is the third largest mall in terms of total space in the National Capital Region behind Rideau Centre and Bayshore Shopping Centre with 880,736 sq ft of leasable area, although a large portion of the mall's gross leasable area is utilized by non-retail tenants. It is currently the 27th largest mall in Canada. If approved, the expansion would make St. Laurent Centre the 10th largest mall in Canada. The expansion plan is currently on hold indefinitely.

The mall has a total of 195 stores and services on three levels.  The centre also hosts a large amount of non-retail tenants including office space, a dental clinic, a gym (GoodLife Fitness), a second-run theatre and a career college (Willis College).

OC Transpo's St-Laurent station is connected to the mall. It has three levels: the underground Confederation Line platforms, the intermediate mezzanine which connects to the shopping centre, and a local bus platform on the upper level where OC Transpo routes 5, 7, 14 and 18 all end or start their trips. The tunnel-level is accessible via escalators and elevators from the mall. OC Transpo also has a client service kiosk at the station. The original Transitway station opened in 1987 after the mall had an expansion of about 80 stores. On June 28, 2015, the underground Transitway platforms closed for the construction of the Confederation Line which began service on September 14, 2019.

Rider Express offers a Toronto-Kingston-Ottawa service departing from Entrance 3 of St. Laurent Centre. Megabus intercity buses bound for Kingston, Scarborough, and Toronto depart from Stop C at St-Laurent Station

References

External links

Official website

Shopping malls established in 1967
Shopping malls in Ottawa